Charlie Weber may refer to:

 Charlie Weber (baseball) (1868–1914), Major League Baseball pitcher
 Charlie Weber (actor) (born 1978), American actor
 Charlie Weber (alderman) (born c. 1882), Chicago Alderman (45th Ward) 1926–60

See also
Charles Weber (disambiguation)